Red Level is an unincorporated community in Rusk County, Texas, United States.

Notes

Unincorporated communities in Rusk County, Texas
Unincorporated communities in Texas